List of Korean actors may refer to:

 List of North Korean actors
 List of South Korean actresses
 List of South Korean male actors